Apatelodes adrastia is a moth in the family Apatelodidae first described by Herbert Druce in 1887. It is found in Mexico, Costa Rica and Panama.

References

Apatelodidae
Moths described in 1887